Jutoupi (sometimes Jutopi) is a Taiwanese pop artist who brought a new musical style to Asia in 1994. Through his Funny Rap album series, Jutoupi focused on difficult topics, such as sex and political issues, through a mixture of Mandarin, Taiwanese, and English. His subsequent switch to dance/aboriginal music mixes was not well received by his fan base.

History
Jutoupi started his career as Zhu Yuexin. Known as the "Bob Dylan of Taiwan," Jutoupi traveled around Taiwan to take part in social and political movements while accompanying himself on guitar. In 1994, Jutoupi joined Rock Records, a Taiwanese record label founded in 1980 by Sam and Johnny Duan. At Rock Records, Jutoupi changed his image by producing punk/rock style, fused with a range of Taiwanese and Western styles and adopting the confrontational name Jutoupi, a name that means pigheaded.

Jutoupi's first record, Funny Rap I: You Sick Suck Nutz Psycho Mania Crazy taipei City (Rock Records/Mandala Works, Taiwan) (1994) was part of a set of three Funny Rap albums. Jutoupi's Funny Rap focused on difficult topics, such as sex and political issues, through a mixture of Mandarin, Taiwanese, and English. Funny Rap I was followed by Happy New Year (Mandala Works, Taiwan), ROC on Taiwan (Magic Stone, Taiwan), and Hexi de Yewan O A A (Rock Records/Magic Stone, Taiwan). Hexi de Yewan  represented a jump from rap music based on Taiwanese society to house music based on aborigines society. Noted as the first mainstream album in Taiwan featuring aboriginal music, each song contains dance music mixed with music sampled from one tribe. Jutoupi's subsequent switch to dance/aboriginal music mixes was not well received by his fan base.

References

Living people
Taiwanese Mandopop singer-songwriters
Taiwanese Hokkien pop singers
Year of birth missing (living people)